Pulaski Historic Residential District is a national historic district located at Pulaski, Pulaski County, Virginia. It encompasses 278 contributing buildings in a primarily residential section of the town of Pulaski.  The dwellings are primarily frame and brick residences dating from the 1880s through the 1940s. They include the large homes of the factory managers, and the more modest homes of workers. Notable non-residential buildings include the Trinity Evangelical Lutheran Church (c. 1890), the First Baptist Church (125-6-280) (c. 1892), the First Christian Church (Disciples of Christ) (c. 1906), the law office of Samuel N. Hurst, Masonic Lodge, and Pulaski Women's Club.

It was added to the National Register of Historic Places in 1988.

References

Historic districts in Pulaski County, Virginia
Colonial Revival architecture in Virginia
Neoclassical architecture in Virginia
Tudor Revival architecture in Virginia
National Register of Historic Places in Pulaski County, Virginia
Historic districts on the National Register of Historic Places in Virginia